, also known by his Chinese style name , was a bureaucrat of Ryukyu Kingdom.

An'i was the eighth head of an aristocrat family, Mō-uji Ikegusuku Dunchi. He was a grandson of Ikegusuku Anken.

An'i was dispatched to China to pay tribute together with Tei Kōryō and Tei Junsoku in 1696. He went to Satsuma to report this in 1698. He served as a member of sanshikan from 1699 to 1710.

He was good at waka poetry.

References

1669 births
1710 deaths
Ueekata
Sanshikan
People of the Ryukyu Kingdom
Ryukyuan people
17th-century Ryukyuan people
18th-century Ryukyuan people